Qyzylaghash (Qyzylağaş), sometimes spelled Kyzylagash, is a village in Almaty Region of south-eastern Kazakhstan. In March 2010 at least 43 people died in Qyzylaghash as a result of a dam failure.

References

Populated places in Almaty Region